Antoine Krier (21 April 1897 – 22 September 1983) was a Luxembourgish politician for the Luxembourg Socialist Workers' Party (LSAP).

From 1929 until 1935, Krier was the President of the LSAP's predecessor party, the Socialist Party.

Antoine was the brother of fellow politician Pierre Krier.

Luxembourg Socialist Workers' Party politicians
Mayors of Esch-sur-Alzette
1897 births
1983 deaths
People from Luxembourg City